Bill Marshall, CM, (1939 – January 1, 2017) was a Scottish-born Canadian filmmaker, film producer and theater producer. In 1976, Marshall co-founded the Toronto Festival of Festivals, now known as the Toronto International Film Festival (TIFF), with Dusty Cohl and Henk Van der Kolk. The first Festival of Festivals drew just 5,000 attendees to view 127 films in October 1976. The Toronto Film Festival is now one of the largest film festivals in the world and established Toronto as a major hub for film and cinema. Marshall has been called "a pioneer in the Canadian film industry" for his role in both establishing the festival, as well as expanding the Canadian film-making into a major, nationwide artistic and business sector.

Biography 
Marshall was born in Glasgow, Scotland,  in 1939. His father was a railway worker and socialist, and also a fan of drama, regularly visiting the left-wing Citizens Theatre in the city. In 1955, when Bill was just 15, the whole family emigrated to Canada, and Bill later became a Canadian citizen. During his professional career, Marshall produced thirteen feature films, as well as several theater productions, including the Toronto run of the musical, Hair.

Marshall and Henk Van der Kolk had a professional and personal relationship spanning more than 49 years. The duo first met while both were working on the set of Frankenstein on Campus in 1969.

In 1976, Marshall teamed with Henk Van der Kolk and Dusty Cohl to co-found the Festival of Festivals, now known as the Toronto Film Festival. Marshall served as the film festival's director from 1976 to 1979 and retained the title of Toronto International Film Festival chairman emeritus.

In addition to his role in co-founding the Toronto Film Festival, Marshall spearheaded the creation of both the Academy of Canadian Cinema & Television and The Toronto Film and Television Office. He also served as a past president of the Canadian Association of Motion Picture Producers.

In 2002, Marshall was appointed as a Member of the Order of Canada in recognition of his "major role in developing Canada's film industry and culture." Most recently, Marshall and Van der Kolk proposed a possible film festival in Trenton, Ontario, the location of one of Canada's first film studios, for Canada's 150th sesquicentennial in 2017.

Bill Marshall died of cardiac arrest during the morning of January 1, 2017, at the age of 77. He was survived by his wife, Sari Ruda Marshall, three children, and six grandchildren. Marshall's passing leaves Henk Van der Kolk as the last surviving co-founder of the Toronto Film Festival; Dusty Cohl died in January 2008.

References

1939 births
2017 deaths
Film festival founders
Film producers from Ontario
Canadian theatre managers and producers
Place of death missing
Members of the Order of Canada
Toronto International Film Festival people
Scottish emigrants to Canada
People from Toronto
Academy of Canadian Cinema & Television people